Shanghai Baoshan Dahua Swordfish is a Chinese professional women's basketball club based in Shanghai, playing in the Women's Chinese Basketball Association (WCBA). It is co-owned by Baoshan District government, Shanghai Sports Institute, and Dahua Group. Before 2014 it was known as Shanghai Octopus, affiliated with the Shanghai Media Group. Between 2007 and 2008 it was sponsored by the Xiyang Group.

Season-by-season records

Current players

Notable former players

 Tracey Braithwaite (2002)
 Tamara Stocks (2002–03)
 Ugo Oha (2004–05)
 Bell Jordan (2005–06)
 Camille Little (2011–13)
 Sylvia Fowles (2013–15)
 Liz Cambage (2015–16)
 Breanna Stewart (2016–18)
 Peng Szu-chin (2014–15, 2017–18)
 Wei Yu-chun (2015–16)
 Ye Li (2004–05)
 Shi Xiufeng (2005–16)

References 

 
Women's Chinese Basketball Association teams